Xabier Markiegi Candina (30 December 1938 – 28 March 2021) was a Spanish  politician, born in Bilbao. He was a member of the Basque Parliament from 1981 to 1994, and served as Ararteko (Ombudsman), of the Basque Country between 1995 and 2000. He participated in the 1980s' negotiations to reach the dissolution of ETA terrorist group.

Markiegi died in Aguadulce on Sunday, 28 March 2021.

Selected works

References

1938 births
2021 deaths
Spanish politicians
Spanish civil servants
Members of the 1st Basque Parliament
Members of the 2nd Basque Parliament
Members of the 3rd Basque Parliament
Members of the 4th Basque Parliament
Politicians from Bilbao
Euskadiko Ezkerra politicians
Basque academics
University of Salamanca alumni
Pontifical University of Salamanca alumni
Ombudsmen in Spain